Magdeburg Zoo is a zoo in the city of Magdeburg in the region Sachsen-Anhalt, Germany.

About the Zoo
Zoo Magdeburg has kept flatland tapirs (Tapirus terrestris) since 1980 and has recorded 31 births from three females up to 2018. 15 male and 16 female pups were born, of which six males and nine females grew up. The last female cub born was bottle-reared.

In 2015, the zoo kept around 1400 animals from 190 species.

History 

After the second world war there was a public interest to develop a zoological garden. Many volunteers took part in the creation of the Magdeburger Tiergarten, which opened 1 July 1950.

1957 it was decided to make the zoo larger, and in 1959 it had an areal of 20 ha, and the name was changed to Zoologischer Garten Magdeburg, shortened to Zoo Magdeburg.

In 1960 the first elephant arrived from Assam in India, a female Asian elephant called Sonja, who unfortunately died of elephantsmallpox in 1971.

From 1979 to 1998, during the appointment for the new director, Zoologist Wolfgang Puschmann, the zoo became internationally famous for its breeding of black rhinos and other threatened species.

1981 started a renovation of the zoo, and a lot of classical exhibits were replaced by more modern enclosures.

Pictures

Literature 
 Michael Schröpel: Im Zeichen des Luchses. 50 Jahre Zoo Magdeburg. Magdeburg ohne Jahr, ohne ISBN
 Björn Encke et al.: 60 Jahre Zoo Magdeburg. Von A–Z. Hrsg.: Zoologischer Garten Magdeburg. Klaus Schüling Verlag, Münster 2010. .

See also 
 List of zoos in Germany

References

External links

 
 Magdeburg Zoo at Zoo-Infos.de (in English)

Zoos in Germany
Zoos established in 1950
Zoological Garden
Zoological Garden